San Lorenzo Dorsino is a commune in Trentino, northern Italy. It was created in 2015 by the merger of the former communes of San Lorenzo in Banale and Dorsino.

References